George "Ziggy" Snider (born December 8, 1940 in Fresno, California) is a retired American race car driver.  A longtime driver in the United States Automobile Club Silver Crown series, Snider is also a 22-time starter of the Indianapolis 500, the most starts without winning the race.  His best finish was eighth in the 1975 Indianapolis 500.  Snider made many starts driving for his good friend A. J. Foyt.  His last Indy start was in 1987. Snider is known to many fans by his nickname "Ziggy".

Snider is the 1971 USAC Silver Crown Champion and the 1981-1982 USAC Champ Car champion, the last "big car" championship to include pavement races other than the Indy 500.

Snider owns Silver Crown race cars and, in 2005, allowed Foyt's grandson A. J. Foyt IV to race a car at the Milwaukee Mile.

Snider is currently a partner in ownership of non wing 360ci and 410ci sprint car teams in California (BUSTER AND ZIGGY RACING). Peter Murphy (originally from Australia now residing in Fresno, CA) currently drives their 360ci non wing sprint car in USAC West Coast 360 competition. Bud Kaeding (multi time USAC champion and Oval Nationals champion) drove the 410ci sprint car for the team on August 14, 2010 at Santa Maria Speedway in a USAC/CRA racing event where he placed 3rd.

Complete USAC Championship Car results

1: At the 1981 Indianapolis 500, Snider initially qualified 29th, but the sold the car to Tim Richmond. Richmond drove the car on race day.

Complete PPG Indy Car Series results

Indianapolis 500 results

External links
Driver Database Profile

1940 births
American racing drivers
Champ Car drivers
Indianapolis 500 drivers
Living people
Sportspeople from Fresno, California
Racing drivers from Fresno, California
Racing drivers from California
USAC Silver Crown Series drivers
A. J. Foyt Enterprises drivers
EuroInternational drivers
Team Penske drivers
USAC Gold Crown champions